The George Obendorf Gothic Arch Truss Barn is a Gothic-arch barn built in 1915 from a Sears, Roebuck & Co. kit.  It was listed on the National Register of Historic Places in 1999.

Its components were pre-manufactured by Sears, Roebuck & Co., shipped to Wilder, and assembled by local carpenters and the Obendorf family.

References

Gothic-arch barns
Barns on the National Register of Historic Places in Idaho
Buildings and structures completed in 1915
Canyon County, Idaho